Gap Band V- Jammin' is the seventh album (contrary to the title) by the Gap Band, released in 1983 on Total Experience Records. The album was reissued on CD in 1997 by Mercury Records. In 2009, the album was remastered by PTG Records.

The album reached #2 on the Black Albums chart and #28 on the Pop Albums chart. The album produced the singles "Party Train" (#3 R&B) and "Jam the Motha'" (#16 R&B). Other less successful singles include "Shake A Leg", "I'm Ready (If You're Ready)" (which were both released as remixes); and the UK-only singles "Jammin' In America" and "Someday". To date, it is the Gap Band's last gold album.

Production
"Someday" (a loose cover of the Donny Hathaway song "Someday We'll All Be Free") and the single remix of "Shake A Leg" as a form of a dub version was on the Party train maxi single. With the exception of "Party Train" and "Smile" (which were co-produced by label owner Lonnie Simmons), the album was produced by oldest brother Ronnie Wilson.

Critical reception
Robert Christgau wrote: "Like Cameo and Rick James before them, these old pros blew their sure shots on the breakthrough--this drops no bombs. But once again the follow-up album compensates for never getting up by never letting up--the uptempo stuff steadfastly maintains their hand-stamped party groove, and like Cameo (forget Rick James), they've figured out what to do with the slow ones."

Track listing

Charts

Weekly charts

Year-end charts

References

External links
 Gap Band V: Jammin' at Discogs
 Myspace Page
 Encyclopedia of Oklahoma History and Culture - Gap Band
 The Gap Band at WhoSampled
 Charlie Wilson in-depth interview by Pete Lewis, 'Blues & Soul' August 2011
 Charlie Wilson 2011 Interview at Soulinterviews.com

1983 albums
The Gap Band albums
Total Experience Records albums
Albums recorded at Total Experience Recording Studios